

The Bernard 20 was a 1920s French single-seat monoplane fighter aircraft designed and built by the Société des Avions Bernard. Originally displayed as a mock-up at the 1928 Paris Air Show it was a low-wing monoplane based on the Bernard V2 racer. The prototype powered by a  Hispano-Suiza 12Jb inline piston engine first flew in July 1929 from Orly. With its racing inheritance, in 1930 the aircraft flew at a speed of 280 km/h (174 mph).  With the lack of interest by the French authorities for monoplanes the project was abandoned after 18 months of test flying.

Specifications

References

Notes

Bibliography

1920s French fighter aircraft
020
Low-wing aircraft
Single-engined tractor aircraft
Aircraft first flown in 1929